Government Peak Wilderness is a  wilderness area in the northern part of the Snake Range of White Pine County, in the U.S. state of Nevada.

Vegetation
Vegetation in the Wilderness is mostly desert brush and grass at the lower elevations, and a scattering of pinyon and juniper stands on the slopes of Government Peak and surrounding hills.  Bare rock cliffs characterize the eastern side of the Wilderness.

Recreation
Popular recreational activities in Government Peak Wilderness include camping, hiking, backpacking, horseback riding, and hunting.  The area provides opportunities for solitude in George Wash, south of Government Peak, and in the higher juniper covered areas.

See also
 List of wilderness areas in Nevada
 List of U.S. Wilderness Areas
 Wilderness Act

References

External links
 Government Peak Wilderness fact sheet and map - Nevada BLM
 Government Peak Wilderness - Wilderness.net
 Government Peak Wilderness - Friends of Nevada Wilderness

Wilderness areas of Nevada
Protected areas of White Pine County, Nevada
Bureau of Land Management areas in Nevada
Protected areas established in 2006
2006 establishments in Nevada